Building at 409 West Baltimore Street, also known as the N. Hess & Bro. Building, is a historic retail and wholesale building located at Baltimore, Maryland, United States. It is a four-story brick commercial building with a cast-iron façade above an altered storefront, erected about 1875.  Built originally for a wholesale grocery company, it was subsequently occupied by a boot and shoe factory, and a series of wholesale and retail dry goods or clothing stores.

The building at 409 West Baltimore Street was listed on the National Register of Historic Places in 1994. The building next door at 407 West Baltimore, the L. Frank & Son Building, was listed at the same time.

References

External links
, including photo from 1986, at Maryland Historical Trust

Cast-iron architecture in Baltimore
Commercial buildings on the National Register of Historic Places in Baltimore
Commercial buildings completed in 1875
Downtown Baltimore